Qazançı (also, Gazanchy, Gazanchi, and Ghazanchy) is a village in the Agdam District of Azerbaijan.

References 

Populated places in Aghdam District